Chinamax is a standard of ship measurements that allow conforming ships to use various harbours when fully laden, the maximum size of such a ship being  draft,  beam and  length overall. An example of ships of this size is the Valemax bulk carriers.

The standard was originally developed to carry very large loads of iron ore to China from Brazilian port facilities operated by mineral firm Vale.

Correspondingly, harbours and other infrastructure that are "Chinamax-compatible" are those at which such ships can readily dock. Unlike Suezmax and Panamax, Chinamax is not determined by locks or channels, or bridges—the Chinamax standard is aimed at port provisions and the name is derived from the massive dry-bulk (ore) shipments that China receives from around the globe.

In container shipping, recent classes intended for trade with China have all focused on a ~400 meter length, which deep water container terminals can cater for.

Examples 
 Lolabé, Cameroon—iron ore port.

See also 
 List of Panamax ports
 Cargo ship sizes Handymax, Panamax, Suezmax, Capesize

References

External links 
Tanker ships
Ship sizes
Chinamax

Very large ore carriers
Ship measurements